David Nathan may refer to:

David Nathan (journalist) (1926–2001), British journalist
David Nathan (music writer) (born 1948), British music writer specialising in soul music
David G. Nathan (born 1929), American pediatrician and hematologist
David L. Nathan (born 1968), American psychiatrist, writer, and founder of Doctors for Cannabis Regulation
David Nathan (merchant) (1816–1886), early colonial shopkeeper and businessman in New Zealand
David Nathan (fencer) (born 1965), Australian fencer
David Nathan (politician), American politician and businessman
R. Raghu, Indian filmmaker who changed his name to David Nathan in 2015.

See also